Bishop College was a historically black college, founded in Marshall, Texas, United States, in 1881 by the Baptist Home Mission Society. It was intended to serve students in east Texas, where the majority of the black population lived at the time. In 1961 the administration moved the college into Dallas, Texas.  It closed in 1988.

In 2006 the president of Georgetown College in Georgetown, Kentucky reached out to Bishop College alumni, proposing to have them "adopt" his college as an alma mater. He offered scholarships to their descendants, with a chance to have their diploma read "Bishop College". This was part of an effort to increase minority enrollment at Georgetown.

History

The college was founded by the Baptist Home Mission Society in 1881 as the result of a movement to build a college for African-American Baptists. Nathan Bishop, who had been the superintendent of several major school systems in New England, started this effort. Baylor University President Rufus C. Burleson secured a pledge of $25,000 from Judge Bishop to start the college during a meeting of the National Baptist Education Society meeting in Philadelphia, Pennsylvania.

A committee of Baptist ministers from East Texas, where most African Americans then lived, selected a location in Marshall, on land belonging to the Holcomb Plantation, Wyalucing.

For the college's first several decades, Bishop's faculty and administration were staffed largely by European Americans. The first African American appointed as president was Joseph J. Rhoads, who started in 1929 and served through the Great Depression and World War II. During his presidency, Bishop phased out the high school preparatory programs associated with the college, which had operated to help students compensate for failures in public education. He emphasized the college's new two-year ministerial program.

During the 1930s and 1940s, the ministerial program was developed as the Lacy Kirk Williams Institute. It moved to Dallas when the college moved in 1961. The Lacy Kirk Williams Institute evolved into a week-long seminar which attracted well-known preachers including Jessie Jackson and Martin Luther King, Sr. in 1975. (source, Lloyd Thompson's dissertation for North Texas University, p 34-35)

In 1961, after receiving a grant from the Hoblitzelle Foundation, Bishop moved to a  campus in Dallas. It was able to attract more students there. In Dallas, enrollments increased, peaking at almost 2,000 students around 1970.

The college closed in 1988 after a financial scandal led to the revocation of its accreditation, and its eligibility to receive funds from charities such as the United Negro College Fund. Purchased in 1990 by Comer S. Cottrell, the campus is now used by Paul Quinn College.

In 2006, the president of Georgetown College in Georgetown, Kentucky proposed a plan to Bishop College alumni to make Georgetown their adopted alma mater. Georgetown offers scholarships to children or grandchildren of Bishop alumni or students nominated by Bishop alumni. Upon graduation, these students receive diplomas with the name and insignia of Bishop College. Georgetown president William H. Crouch Jr. hopes the program will help the college reach its goal of increasing minority enrollment to 25% by 2012.

Athletics
The Bishop athletic teams were called the Tigers. The college was a member of the National Association of Intercollegiate Athletics (NAIA), primarily competing as an NAIA Independent from 1965–66 to the school's closure in 1987–88. The Tigers previously competed in the Gulf Coast Athletic Conference (GCAC) from 1958–59 to 1964–65, and the South Central Athletic Conference from 1956–57 to 1957–58. They were also a founding member of the Southwestern Athletic Conference (SWAC) from 1920–21 to 1955–56, which is currently an NCAA Division I FCS athletic conference.

Notable alumni
Listed below is a list of select notable alumni, listed in alphabetical order by last name.

References

External links

 BISHOP COLLEGE R.I.P.?, D Magazine, Published 8.01.1987

 
African-American history of Texas
Historically black universities and colleges in the United States
Educational institutions established in 1881
1881 establishments in Texas
1988 disestablishments in Texas
Educational institutions disestablished in 1988
Defunct private universities and colleges in Texas